Caladenia meridionalis, commonly known as the south coast spider orchid, is a species of orchid endemic to the south-west of Western Australia. It is an early-flowering orchid with a single erect, hairy leaf and one or two white flowers with long, drooping lateral sepals and petals.

Description 
The sepals and petals have dark reddish-brown, drooping, thread-like tips. The lateral sepals spread widely near their bases then hang. The sides of the labellum have short, irregular serrations and there are six to twelve creamy-yellow, anvil-shaped calli with pink markings, in two rows along the centre. Flowering occurs from July to August.

Taxonomy and naming 
Caladenia meridionalis was first described in 2001 by Stephen Hopper and Andrew Phillip Brown and the description was published in Nuytsia. The specific epithet (meridionalis) is a Latin words meaning "southern" referring to the distribution of this species on the south coast.

Distribution and habitat 
The south coast spider orchid occurs between Windy Harbour and Albany in the Warren biogeographic region where it grows in shrubland in consolidated sand dunes.

Conservation
Caladenia meridionalis is classified as "not threatened" by the Western Australian Government Department of Parks and Wildlife.

References 

meridionalis
Orchids of Western Australia
Endemic orchids of Australia
Plants described in 2001
Endemic flora of Western Australia
Taxa named by Stephen Hopper
Taxa named by Andrew Phillip Brown